Józef Zbigniew Gruszka (16 March 1947 – 7 June 2020) was a Polish politician, Member of Parliament, representing Polish People's Party.

Gruszka was born in Kwiatków. He was a graduate of the State Agricultural School (Państwowe Technikum Rolnicze) and a member of Sejm, the lower house of the Polish parliament, elected in Kalisz constituency. From July 2004, he was a member of PKN Orlen investigation commission and, until April 2005, he was also the chairman of the commission. He died in Ostrów Wielkopolski.

References

1947 births
2020 deaths
Members of the Polish Sejm 1993–1997
Members of the Polish Sejm 1997–2001
Members of the Polish Sejm 2001–2005